Base amount or base value  (also basic amount, or basic value, or base rate) (commonly abbreviated as БВ or б. в.) is sort of notional amount used in Belarus to keep amount of pensions, scholarships, social welfare payments, duties, taxes, and fines in the text of laws stable and relevant regardless of the level of inflation.

Base amount is also used in Poland to keep pensions on a stable level, regardless of inflation. A similar measure, income base amount, is used in Sweden.

History
Until 2002, fines, taxes, fees and other payments in Belarus were calculated in multiples up to the minimum wage. In accordance with the Presidential Decree № 3 of 15.02.2002, the minimum wage is used only in labor relations.

Usage examples
 Foreign citizens entering the Republic of Belarus for less than a month of stay should have funds equivalent to at least 2 base amounts per each day of stay. For stays extending a month, foreign citizens should have funds equivalent to at least 50 base amounts.
 The Belarusian Code of Administrative Offences contains no fines in rubles, base amount is used as unit instead. For individuals, fines have a size of from 0.1 to 500 base amounts.
 Victims of the terrorist attack in Minsk have received financial assistance in the amount of up to 1000 base amounts.
 The maximum monthly unemployment benefit in Belarus is twice the base amount.

Amount and effective dates

Simplified approximation
As seen above, from 2005 year base amount is set in amount that can be approximated to €10. For example, if the amount of some fine is 35 base amounts, it can be easily assumed as €350.

The United States Department of State in its travel information uses an approximation of 2 base amounts to €25, which covers the actual amount on the safe side.

See also
 Average Indexed Monthly Earnings

Notes

References

Inflation
Economy of Belarus